Ahmadabad (also Romanized as Aḩmadābād) is a village in Zarivar Rural District, in the Central District of Marivan County, Kurdistan Province, Iran. At the 2006 census, its population was 58, in 8 families. The village is populated by Kurds.

References 

Towns and villages in Marivan County
Kurdish settlements in Kurdistan Province